The Sri Narrawada Vengamamba Devestanam (Sri Vengamamba, Vengamamba Perantalu, Sri Narrawada Vengamamba Perantalu, Sri Vengamamba Perantalu Devestanam, Vengamamba Narrawada, Narrawada Vengamamba Perantalu, Narrawada Vengamamba, Sri Vengamamba Perantalu) is a 300-year-old temple. The temple is situated in the village of Narrawada, India.

This temple is famous in the surrounding area, and is dedicated to the Goddess Sri Vengamamba, a wish-satisfier goddess. The temple's festival conducted each year in the months of June and July, called Sri Vengamamba Tirunala, is visited by more than 5 lakhs (500,000) Pilgrims from South Indian states 

The easiest way to travel to the temple is by bus from Pamuru which is 23km from Narrawada.

See also
 Narrawada Wiki pages

External links 
 Sri Vengamamba Perantalu Devastanam, Narrawada
 Sri Narrawada Vengamamba Perantalu
 Narrawada Village Entrance Arch

Hindu temples in Nellore district